This article displays the rosters for the participating teams at the 2014 FIBA Africa Club Championship.

Abidjan Basket Club

ASB Mazembe

Basket Club M'Tsapere

Club Africain

Étoile Sportive Radès

Malabo Kings

Mark Mentors

Primeiro de Agosto

Recreativo do Libolo

Sporting Club Alexandria

US Monastir

References

External links
 2014 FIBA Africa Champions Cup Participating Teams

FIBA Africa Clubs Champions Cup squads
FIBA